Malcolm Walker (born 1950) is a New Zealand architect and cartoonist based in Auckland.

He has been an editorial cartoonist for the Sunday News for a number of years and his work also appears in other publications. Walker has won the 2001 and 2002 Cartoonist of the Year in the Qantas Media Awards.

Selected bibliography
Erratic Scratchings (1984) 
Up and under! : rugby cartoons (1987) 
Did you mean to do that? : Malcolm Walker architectural cartoons (2012)

References

New Zealand architects
New Zealand cartoonists
1950 births
Living people